Pana Rora Island is an island in Papua New Guinea, part of the Calvados Chain within the Louisiade Archipelago. It is located near Utian Island.  It is used as a gardening island for the Utian Islanders.

References

Islands of Milne Bay Province
Louisiade Archipelago